In mathematics, particularly in set theory, the beth numbers are a certain sequence of infinite cardinal numbers (also known as transfinite numbers), conventionally written , where  is the second Hebrew letter (beth).

Definition 
Beth numbers are defined by transfinite recursion:

 
 
 

The cardinal  is the cardinality of any countably infinite set such as the set  of natural numbers, so that  .

Let  be an ordinal, and  be a set with cardinality . Then, 
the cardinal  is the result of cardinal exponentiation, and

Given this definition,

are respectively the cardinalities of

Because of Cantor's theorem, each set in the preceding sequence has cardinality strictly greater than the one preceding it. For infinite limit ordinals, λ, the corresponding beth number is defined to be the supremum of the beth numbers for all ordinals strictly smaller than λ:

One can also show that the von Neumann universes  have cardinality .

Relation to the aleph numbers 
Assuming the axiom of choice, infinite cardinalities are linearly ordered; no two cardinalities can fail to be comparable.

Repeating this argument (see  transfinite induction) yields 
 
for all ordinals .

The continuum hypothesis is equivalent to

The generalized continuum hypothesis says the sequence of beth numbers thus defined is the same as the sequence of aleph numbers, i.e., 
 
for all ordinals .

Specific cardinals

Beth null 
Since this is defined to be , or aleph null, sets with cardinality  include:

the natural numbers N
the rational numbers Q
the algebraic numbers
the computable numbers and computable sets
the set of finite sets of integers
the set of finite multisets of integers
the set of finite sequences of integers

Beth one 

Sets with cardinality  include:

the transcendental numbers
the irrational numbers
the real numbers R
the complex numbers C
the uncomputable real numbers
Euclidean space Rn
the power set of the natural numbers (the set of all subsets of the natural numbers)
the set of sequences of integers (i.e. all functions N → Z, often denoted ZN)
the set of sequences of real numbers, RN
the set of all real analytic functions from R to R
the set of all continuous functions from R to R
the set of finite subsets of real numbers
the set of all analytic functions from C to C (the holomorphic functions)

Beth two 
 (pronounced beth two) is also referred to as 2c (pronounced two to the power of c).

Sets with cardinality  include:

 The power set of the set of real numbers, so it is the number of subsets of the real line, or the number of sets of real numbers
 The power set of the power set of the set of natural numbers
 The set of all functions from R to R (RR)
 The set of all functions from Rm to Rn
 The power set of the set of all functions from the set of natural numbers to itself, so it is the number of sets of sequences of natural numbers
 The Stone–Čech compactifications of R, Q, and N
 The set of deterministic fractals in Rn 
 The set of random fractals in Rn

Beth omega 
 (pronounced beth omega) is the smallest uncountable strong limit cardinal.

Generalization
The more general symbol , for ordinals α and cardinals κ, is occasionally used. It is defined by:

 if λ is a limit ordinal.

So

In Zermelo–Fraenkel set theory (ZF), for any cardinals κ and μ, there is an ordinal α such that:

And in ZF, for any cardinal κ and ordinals α and β:

Consequently, in ZF absent ur-elements with or without the axiom of choice, for any cardinals κ and μ, the equality

holds for all sufficiently large ordinals β. That is, there is an ordinal α such that the equality holds for every ordinal β ≥ α.

This also holds in Zermelo–Fraenkel set theory with ur-elements (with or without the axiom of choice), provided that the ur-elements form a set which is equinumerous with a pure set (a set whose transitive closure contains no ur-elements). If the axiom of choice holds, then any set of ur-elements is equinumerous with a pure set.

Borel determinacy 

Borel determinacy is implied by the existence of all beths of countable index.

See also 

 Transfinite number
 Uncountable set

References

Bibliography

 T. E. Forster, Set Theory with a Universal Set: Exploring an Untyped Universe, Oxford University Press, 1995 — Beth number is defined on page 5.
  See pages 6 and 204–205 for beth numbers.
  See page 109 for beth numbers.

Cardinal numbers
Infinity